Angela Clarke (August 14, 1909 – December 16, 2010) was an American stage, television and film actress.

Career 
Clarke appeared in over thirty films throughout her forty-year career, usually in bit parts or in background roles, uncredited. Films in which she made a large impression included The Seven Little Foys, in which she played a large supporting role as Bob Hope's disapproving sister-in-law, House of Wax, (1953) A Double Life, The Gunfighter and The Miracle of Our Lady of Fatima.

Clarke, despite entering the film business in her early forties (in 1949's The Undercover Man), cornered the market for grey-haired, matriarchal motherly-types (such as her role as Mama Caruso in The Great Caruso).

Death 
Clarke died, aged 101, in Moorpark, California. Clarke is buried in Westwood Village Memorial Park Cemetery.

Filmography

Television

References

External links 

 

1909 births
2010 deaths
Actresses from New York (state)
American centenarians
American film actresses
American television actresses
American stage actresses
Women centenarians
21st-century American women